Hinrich Wilhelm Kopf (6 May 1893 – 21 December 1961) was a German politician (SPD). He joined the SPD in 1919. Kopf worked from 1939 to 1943 on behalf of the Nazi government as an asset manager in occupied Poland, initially with his own company together with the lawyer Edmund Bohne, later for the Haupttreuhandstelle Ost and was "trustee of confiscated Polish and Jewish goods" and worked as an expropriation commissioner in the Lubliniec region .

He served as Prime Minister of the short-lived State of Hanover in 1946 and then as Minister President of Lower Saxony from 1946 to 1955 and from 1959 to 1961. He served as the third President of the Bundesrat from 7 September 1951 to 6 September 1952.

Kopf was born in Neuenkirchen, Hanover, and died in Göttingen.

His grave is located in the Stöcken city cemetery in Hanover and was a so-called honorary grave of the city of Hanover until 2015, whose administration decorated it with flowers and cared for it.

References

External links 
 
 

1893 births
1961 deaths
Presidents of the German Bundesrat
People from the Province of Hanover
University of Göttingen alumni
Social Democratic Party of Germany politicians
Grand Crosses 1st class of the Order of Merit of the Federal Republic of Germany
Ministers-President of Lower Saxony
Ministers of the Lower Saxony State Government